Bolo de rolo (English translation: rollcake) is a typical Brazilian dessert, from Pernambuco state. The cake batter is made with flour, eggs, butter and sugar. This dough is wrapped with a layer of guava paste, giving the appearance of a swiss roll with much thinner layers. It is recognized as a national dish in Brazilian law.

History
Its origin lies in the adaptation of Portuguese cake colchão de noiva (bride's mattress), a kind of sponge cake rolled with a filling of nuts. Upon arriving in Brazil, the Portuguese cooks changed the filling to guava fruit, which is plentiful in northeastern Brazil, cooked with  sugar, which was abundant since it was made in the factories of the region. It is common to sprinkle the bolo de rolo with sugar for presentation.

Ordinary Law № 379/2007: bolo de rolo was recognized as intangible heritage of Pernambuco.

See also
 List of Brazilian sweets and desserts

References

Further reading

External links 
Petit chef - O famoso Bolo de Rolo (portuguese)
Casa dos Frios

Brazilian desserts
Guava dishes
Stuffed desserts
Butter cakes